Kim Won-jin may refer to:
Kim Won-jin (athlete) (born 1968)
Kim Won-jin (fencer) (born 1984)
Kim Won-jin (judoka) (born 1992)